The Oldman River is a river in southern Alberta, Canada. It flows roughly west to east from the Rocky Mountains, through the communities of Fort Macleod, Lethbridge, and on to Grassy Lake, where it joins the Bow River to form the South Saskatchewan River, which eventually drains into the Hudson Bay.

History
The Oldman River was, at one time, known as the Belly River. The Belly River is now a separate river that is a tributary of the Oldman.

In 1991, the Alberta government finished construction of the Oldman River Dam. The Piikani renegade, led by Milton Born With A Tooth, had attempted to divert the Oldman River away from the Lethbridge Northern Irrigation District canal intake, leading to an armed standoff. The dam was constructed where the Oldman, Crowsnest, and Castle river systems converge.

2013 floods
On June 21, 2013, during the 2013 Alberta floods Alberta experienced heavy rainfall that triggered catastrophic flooding throughout much of the southern half of the province along the Bow, Elbow, Highwood and Oldman rivers and tributaries. A dozen municipalities in Southern Alberta declared local states of emergency on June 21 as water levels rose and numerous communities were placed under evacuation orders.

Tributaries

From headwaters to mouth, Oldman River receives:
Livingstone River
Crowsnest River
Castle River
Pincher Creek
Beaver Creek
Willow Creek
Belly River
Waterton River
St. Mary River
Lee Creek
Little Bow River

Nature
Oldman River originates in the Beehive Natural Area, an area of alpine tundra and old-growth spruce and fir forests. Downstream it flows through Bob Creek Wildland Provincial Park and Black Creek Heritage Rangeland. Oldman Dam and Oldman River are other Provincial Recreation Areas established along the river.

The river and some of its tributaries have formed coulees in Southern Alberta, and the strata revealed by these formations guide local prospectors to ammolite deposits.

Fish
The Oldman River contains fish species such as rainbow trout, cutthroat trout, bull trout, brown trout, hybrid trout species ("cutbow" rainbow and cutthroat cross), mountain whitefish, pike, walleye, lake sturgeon, catostomidae, goldeye, and minnows.

See also
Oldman Formation
Oldman River valley parks system
List of rivers of Alberta

Notes

External links
 Oldman Watershed Council: www.oldmanwatershed.ca

Rivers of Alberta
South Saskatchewan River
Rivers of the Canadian Rockies
Tributaries of Hudson Bay